The South Bay Harbor Trail is a mixed-use path in Boston, Massachusetts opened in 2011 The rail trail extends from Ruggles Station along Melnea Cass Boulevard, across Massachusetts Avenue, along Biosquare Drive near the Massachusetts Avenue Connector, under the Southeast Expressway (Interstate 93), and connects with the Boston Harborwalk in Rolling Bridge Park on Fort Point Channel.  The designation continues with the Harborwalk along the channel until Fan Pier, where showers, lockers, and bike storage will be constructed.

The rail trail cost $4.9 million, paid for by federal highway funds with state match, private property owners which the path crosses, and about $1 million in private fundraising by the non-profit Save The Harbor.

References

External links
South Bay Harbor Trail
Boston In Lincolnshire

Bike paths in Massachusetts
Transportation in Boston